KJ Cerankowski (previously published as Karli June Cerankowski) is an American professor and author whose work focuses on gender and human sexuality with a focus on asexuality studies. They are an assistant professor of Comparative American Studies and Gender, Sexuality, and Feminist Studies at Oberlin College. With Megan Milks, they co-edited Asexualities: Feminist and Queer Perspectives (Routledge, 2014).

Education and career

Cerankowski received a Ph.D. in Modern Thought and Literature at Stanford University in 2014; they completed a dissertation entitled Illegible: asexualities in media, literature, and performance analyzing the cultural significance of asexuality as "a queer way of thinking about sexual subjectivity, desire, and intimacy."

Cerankowski is an assistant professor of Comparative American Studies and Gender, Sexuality, and Feminist Studies at Oberlin College. Before joining the Oberlin faculty, they were a lecturer in the department of Feminist, Gender, and Sexuality Studies at Stanford University and a fellow at the Clayman Institute for Gender Research.

Selected works
With Megan Milks, Cerankowski co-edited Asexualities: Feminist and Queer Perspectives (Routledge, 2014), one of the earliest collections of essays on the study of asexuality.

Cerankowski's writings have been published in Feminist Studies and WSQ: Women's Studies Quarterly.

Cerankowski published "Suture: Trauma and Trans Becoming" in November 2021

See also
 List of LGBT writers
 List of Stanford University people

References

Living people
LGBT studies academics
American LGBT writers
Queer writers
Oberlin College faculty
Stanford University alumni
Writers from Ohio
Year of birth missing (living people)